Silvio Mondinelli (nicknamed "Gnaro", born 24 June 1958), is an Italian mountaineer. In the year 2007, he became the 13th person to climb the 14 eight-thousanders. He is the 6th person to accomplish that feat without the use of supplementary oxygen. He was 49 years old when he summited the last of the 14 summits, a task he started in 1993 and finished in 2007.

Broad Peak was the last peak he conquered to cement his place among the rare climbers who summited the 14 highest points on Earth.

Career
Mondinelli began his mountaineering career by making several ascents in the Alps, especially Monte Rosa. In 1981 he became an Alpine Guide and from 1987 to 1991 he worked as a guide instructor. In 1984 he began climbing mountains outside of Europe, especially in North and South America, the Himalayas, and Karakorum.

2001 was undoubtedly one of the most important years of his career: in only five months he climbed four 8,000 meters peaks: Everest, Gasherbrum I, Gasherbrum II and Dhaulagiri. On 25 July 2004 he reached the peak of K2 (8611 m) and declared the success of the "K2 2004–50 years later" expedition.
 
Mondinelli prepares his enterprises in extreme detail, beginning with training. Every day he runs uphill: 1200 meters difference in altitude, combined during the winter with Alpine skiing. In the evening he does one hour on the stationary bicycle to recover and loosen up his muscles. Gnaro is known not only for never having used oxygen during his climbs, but also for his extreme humanitarian gestures. During his expeditions he has often rescued other climbers in difficulty, often risking the success of his own expedition.

Charitable work
In 2001, Mondinelli was among the founders of the "Amici del Monterosa", the non-profit organisation that deals in developing the living conditions of the Nepalese people. In addition to maintaining the Namche Bazar School, the "Amici del Monterosa" were also involved in the construction of the Makelu hospital district in the region of Dhading (2005).

In the near future, the "Amici del Monterosa" are planning the construction of a professional school for tourism and hotel management in the vicinity of Kathmandu.
Mondinelli, along with a team of expert mountaineers, climbers and researchers, has founded the High Mountain University, in Alagna Valsesia, Piedmont, the first high mountain school open to all upland aficionados.

Notable summits
1984. Puskan T'urpu, North Face (6090m)
1993. Manaslu, South Face (8163m)
1994. Denali (6194m)
1996. Shisha Pangma (8013m)
1997. Aconcagua (6962m) – Cho Oyu (8201m)
2000. Ama Dablam (6812m)
2001. Mount Everest South slope (8848m) – Gasherbrum II (8035m) – Gasherbrum I (8068m) – Dhaulagiri (8156m)
2002. Makalu (8463m)
2003. Kanchenjunga (8586m)
2004. K2 (8611m)
2005. Nanga Parbat (8125m)
2006. Shisha Pangma Main (8027m) – Lhotse (8516m) – Annapurna (8091m)
2007. Broad Peak (8047m).
2010. Mount Everest North slope (8848m).

Honors 
  5th Class / Knight (Cavaliere) Order of Merit of the Italian Republic.
  Gold Cross / Order of Merit of the Guardia di Finanza.

See also
List of climbers, alpinists and mountaineers
List of Mount Everest summiters by number of times to the summit

References

External links
Silvio Mondinelli's personal site

Summiters of all 14 eight-thousanders
1958 births
Living people
Summiters of K2
Italian mountain climbers